The Avro Anson is a British twin-engined, multi-role aircraft built by the aircraft manufacturer Avro. Large numbers of the type served in a variety of roles for the Royal Air Force (RAF), Fleet Air Arm (FAA), Royal Canadian Air Force (RCAF), Royal Australian Air Force and numerous other air forces before, during, and after the Second World War.

Initially known as the Avro 652A, the Anson was developed during the mid-1930s from the earlier Avro 652 airliner in response to a request for tenders issued by the British Air Ministry for a maritime reconnaissance aircraft. Having suitably impressed the Ministry, a single prototype was ordered, which conducted its maiden flight on 24 March 1935. Following an evaluation in which the Type 652A bettered the competing de Havilland DH.89, it was selected as the winner, leading to Air Ministry Specification 18/35 being written around the type and an initial order for 174 aircraft being ordered in July 1935. The Type 652A was promptly named after British Admiral George Anson.

The type was placed into service with the Royal Air Force (RAF) and was initially used in the envisaged maritime reconnaissance operation alongside the larger flying boats. After the outbreak of the Second World War the Anson was soon found to have become obsolete in front line combat roles. Large numbers of the type were instead put to use as a multi-engined aircrew trainer, having been found to be suitable for the role, and became the mainstay of the British Commonwealth Air Training Plan. The type continued to be used in this role throughout and after the conflict, remaining in RAF service as a trainer and communications aircraft until 28 June 1968.

During the post-war climate, the Anson was increasingly produced for the civil market, being used as a light transport and executive aircraft. By the end of production in 1952, a total of 8,138 Ansons had been constructed by Avro in nine variants; in addition, a further 2,882 aircraft were manufactured by Federal Aircraft Ltd in Canada from 1941. By the 21st century, the vast majority of Ansons had been retired from flying. However, a single Anson Mk.I, which had been originally manufactured during 1943, had been restored to airworthiness, having been refitted with later metal wings. On 18 July 2012, this restored aircraft performed its first flight.

Development
In 1933, the British Air Ministry proposed that the Royal Air Force (RAF) acquire a relatively cheap landplane for coastal maritime reconnaissance duties; the proposed aircraft would perform as a supplement to the more capable, but expensive, flying boats which the RAF had adopted for conducting maritime reconnaissance missions. The Air Ministry looked for designs from British manufacturers. Avro responded to the request with the Avro 652A, which was a modified version of their earlier Avro 652, a twin-engined, six-seat monoplane airliner. de Havilland offered a design based on their D.H.89A Dragon Rapide biplane. After evaluating the various submissions received, the Air Ministry decided to order from Avro and de Havilland respectively, single examples of the Type 652A and the de Havilland DH.89 for evaluation purposes late in 1934; an evaluation and the subsequent selection of a design for production to take place by May 1935.

On 24 March 1935, the Avro 652A conducted its maiden flight at Woodford Aerodrome, Greater Manchester. Between 11 and 17 May 1935, the prototype participated in a formal evaluation against the competing DH.89M by the RAF's Coastal Defence Development Unit at RAF Gosport, Hampshire. During these trials, the Avro aircraft proved to be superior and was accordingly selected as the winner of the competition on 25 May 1935. In response to its selection, Air Ministry Specification G.18/35 was written around the Type 652A; in July 1935, an initial order for 174 aircraft, which had been given the service name "Anson", was received.

On 31 December 1935, the first production Anson performed its maiden flight; changes from the prototype included an enlarged horizontal tailplane and reduced elevator span in order to improve stability. Additionally, while the prototype had not been fitted with flaps, production aircraft could accommodate their installation from the onset to increase the viable glide angle and reduce landing speed. On 6 March 1936, deliveries to the RAF commenced. By the end of production in 1952, a total of 11,020 Ansons had been completed, which made it the second most numerous (after the approximately 11,500 Vickers Wellington medium bomber) British multi-engined aircraft of the Second World War.

Design

The Avro Anson was a twin-engine, low-wing cantilever monoplane. Developed as a general reconnaissance aircraft, it possessed many features that lent itself to the role, including considerable load-carrying ability, and long range. The structure of the Anson was relatively straightforward and uncomplicated, relying on proven methods and robust construction to produce an airframe that minimised maintenance requirements. Much of the internal structure had retained similar to the earlier Avro 652 airliner from which it had been developed. The Anson Mk I was furnished with a low-mounted one-piece wooden wing, composed of a combination of plywood and spruce throughout the wingbox and ribs. The fuselage was composed of a welded steel tubing framework which was principally clad in fabric; the exterior of the nose was clad in magnesium alloy.

Each engine was provided with its own duplicated fuel pumps and separate fuel and oil tanks; the tanks were composed of welded aluminium and mounted in cradles housed within the wing. The engine cowlings were intentionally designed to have a reduced diameter in order to reduce their negative impact upon external visibility, which was considered to be valuable to the type's reconnaissance function. These engines drove two-bladed Fairey-built metal propellers.

The Anson was the first aircraft equipped with retractable landing gear to enter service with the RAF. While the main undercarriage was retracted into recesses set into the bottom of the engine nacelles, the tail wheel was fixed in position. Commonly, the undercarriage was fitted with Dunlop-built wheels, tyres and pneumatic brakes and Turner legs. The retractable undercarriage was mechanically operated by hand; 144 turns of a crank handle, situated beside the pilot's seat, were needed. To avoid this laborious process, early aircraft would often perform short flights with the landing gear remaining extended throughout, which would reduce the aircraft's cruising speed by 30 mph (50 km/h).

Initially, the Anson was flown with a three-man crew, which comprised a pilot, a navigator/bomb-aimer and a radio operator/gunner, when it was used in the maritime reconnaissance role; from 1938 onwards, it was typically operated by a four-man crew. The bomb-aimer would perform his function from a prone position in the forward section of the nose, which was provisioned with a bombsight, driftsight, and other appropriate instrumentation, including a landing light. The pilot was located in a cockpit behind the bomb-aimer's position and was provided with a variety of contemporary instrumentation, including those to enable flight under instrument flight rules (IFR) and indirect instrument lighting for night flying purposes.

Immediately behind the pilot's position is a small folding seat fixed to the starboard side of the fuselage for an additional crew member or passenger, along with racks that would contain a pair of parachute packs that would be clipped onto the harnesses worn by both the pilot and the navigator. Behind these is the navigator's station, a chair and table provisioned with navigational aids such as compasses, Bigsworth chart boards, sea markers, slide rules for course, wind and speed, a signalling lamp and float flares. Aft of the rear spar is the wireless operator's station – a table with contemporary wireless equipment, including a winch for the trailing aerial, which was attached to the upper fuselage immediately behind the aircraft's cockpit.

The defensive armaments of the Anson consisted of a single .303 in (7.7 mm) Vickers machine gun which was fixed within the forward fuselage and aimed by the pilot, while an Armstrong Whitworth-built manually operated gun turret located on the Anson's dorsal section was fitted with a single Lewis gun. Those Ansons that were used in the training role were outfitted with dual controls and usually had the gun turret removed, although specific aircraft used for gunnery training were fitted with a Bristol hydraulically operated gun turret, similar to that used in the Bristol Blenheim. The tail fairing of the starboard nacelle contains an inflatable dinghy which is provided with automatic actuators and marine distress beacons.

Operational history

On 6 March 1936, the Anson entered RAF service, No. 48 Squadron was the first RAF unit to be equipped with the type.

By the outbreak of the Second World War, the RAF had received a total of 824 Ansons while there were 26 RAF squadrons that were then operating the Anson I: 10 of these were assigned to Coastal Command and the other 16 were with Bomber Command. By 1939, all of the squadrons assigned to Bomber Command that had been equipped with the Anson I served as operational training squadrons which were used to prepare crews for frontline service. 12 of the squadrons were in No. 6 (Operational Training) Group. Newly formed crews, having previously completed individual flying and technical training courses, were first trained as bomber crews in Ansons before they would advance to the various frontline aircraft types, which were also in the same squadrons with the Ansons. After training in the frontline aircraft type, crews would advance to the frontline bomber squadrons with those aircraft types (Fairey Battle, Bristol Blenheim, Vickers Wellington, Armstrong Whitworth Whitley, and Handley-Page Hampden).

Even before the start of the war, it had been realised that the Anson's limited capabilities would make it ineffective in its intended main role of a maritime patrol aircraft. In 1938, it had been decided to replace the Anson in this role with the American-built Lockheed Hudson, which was 100 mph faster, had three times the range, carried a much heavier bomb load and had a superior defensive armament. The first squadron to be reequipped with the type was already training with them in September 1939. Meanwhile, the remaining Coastal Command Anson squadrons had to go to war with what they had. The Anson had an endurance of only four hours, so that it could only be employed in the North Sea and other coastal areas; however, it lacked the range to reach the coast of Norway. Its weapons against German U-boats were two small 100 lb bombs, which required a direct hit on the hull of a submarine to be effective, at least in theory. On 3 December 1939, an Anson mistakenly attacked a surfaced Royal Navy submarine, and although the aircraft succeeded in hitting the conning tower, the only damage was four broken light bulbs. In an earlier friendly fire incident off the coast of Scotland in September, the bombs of an Anson of No. 233 Squadron had bounced off the surface of the water and exploded in an air burst, which holed the aircraft's fuel tanks causing it to ditch off St Andrews. Despite numerous claims of attacks on U-boats by Ansons in the first months of the war, postwar examination of German records showed that little damage had been incurred. Despite their obsolescence, Ansons were employed during the Dunkirk evacuation to deter attacks on Allied shipping by German E-boats. On 1 June 1940, a flight of three Ansons was attacked near Dunkirk by nine Luftwaffe Messerschmitt Bf 109s. Remarkably, before the dogfight ended, without losing any of their own, one of the Ansons had destroyed two German aircraft and damaged a third.

The aircraft's most successful role, however, was to train pilots for flying multi-engined bombers, such as the Avro Lancaster. Ansons had first been deployed to Flying Training Schools in November 1936, replacing the obsolete bombers that had previously been used for twin-engined training. The Anson was also used to train the other members of a bomber's aircrew, such as navigators, wireless operators, bomb aimers and air gunners. Postwar, the Anson continued in the training and light transport roles. The last Ansons were withdrawn from RAF service with communications units on 28 June 1968.

During the 1939–45 war years, the British Air Transport Auxiliary operated the Anson as its standard taxi aircraft, using it to carry groups of ferry pilots to and from aircraft collection points. There was no fatal mechanical failure of an Anson in ATA service, and it was typically very well regarded.

The Royal Australian Air Force (RAAF) initially ordered 33 Ansons in November 1935 to fill the maritime reconnaissance role. The first were delivered in 1936 and 48 were in service before the start of the war. The RAAF eventually operated a total 1,028 Ansons, the majority of these being Mk Is. These aircraft continued to be operated until 1955.

The Royal New Zealand Air Force (RNZAF) operated 23 Ansons as navigation trainers during the Second World War, (alongside the more numerous Airspeed Oxford), and acquired more Ansons as communication aircraft immediately after the war. A preserved navigation trainer is in the Air Force Museum of New Zealand at Wigram.

The Royal Indian Air Force operated several Ansons as part of the No.1 Service Flying Training School (India) for Pilot and Navigation training. These Ansons continued this role post-independence and were retired at an unknown date.

The Royal Canadian Air Force (RCAF) and Royal Canadian Navy (RCN) operated 4,413 Anson aircraft, 1,962 British built and 2,451 Canadian built aircraft.  The RCN operated the aircraft until 1952. Although the Canadian Ansons were used throughout the training schools of the British Commonwealth Air Training plan for training aircrew, some aircraft were pressed into operational service with the RCAF's Eastern Air Command. A good example of the training schools involvement in combat operations with the EAC during the emergency of the battle is illustrated in an article dated 1 March 2006 of the Royal Canadian Legion magazine entitled Eastern Air Command: Air Force, Part 14; the author Hugh A. Haliday wrote: "The need for Atlantic patrols was undiminished, yet the Battle of the St. Lawrence stretched EAC resources. Based at Charlottetown, 31 General Reconnaissance School was mobilised to fly patrols using Avro Ansons, each carrying two 250-pound bombs. At the very outset of the war the Anson and its ordnance had failed in RAF anti-submarine work. Now in Canada it was remobilised as an aerial scarecrow. German views varied as to Canadian countermeasures. The captain of U-517 found his operations increasingly restricted by strengthened air patrols. In October 1942, U-69 reported "strong sea patrol and constant patrol by aircraft with radar."

The United States Army Air Forces (USAAF), employed 50 Canadian-built Ansons, which were designated the AT-20.

The Egyptian Air Force (EAF) operated a fleet of Ansons in communications and VIP duties. A specially outfitted Anson was presented to the then King of Egypt by the RAF. The Royal Afghan Air Force obtained 13 Anson 18 aircraft for various duties from 1948. These aircraft survived until 1972.

Postwar civil use

After the war, Ansons continued in production with Avro at Woodford. At this time, large amounts of the type were being produced for civilian use, where they were operated as light transports by a range of small charter airlines and as executive aircraft by large corporations. Countries which saw civilian operations with Ansons included the United Kingdom, Canada (Mk. V aircraft only), Australia and Denmark.

Railway Air Services operated Ansons on scheduled services from London's Croydon Airport via Manchester to Belfast (Nutts Corner) in 1946 and 1947. Sivewright Airways operated three Mk XIX aircraft from their Manchester Airport base on charter flights as far as Johannesburg and on scheduled flights to Ronaldsway Airport in the Isle of Man until 1951. Finglands Airways operated an ex-RAF Anson I on inclusive tour flights and on scheduled flights from Manchester Airport to Newquay Airport between 1949 and 1952. Kemps Aerial Surveys operated several Anson XIXs on survey work within the UK until their retirement in 1973.

In 1948, India ordered 12 new Anson 18Cs for use by the Directorate of Civil Aviation as trainers and communications aircraft; these were delivered from Yeadon in the spring of 1949.

Ansons continued to be manufactured by Avro at Woodford for the RAF until March 1952; the type was used as trainers and served in the role of Station communications aircraft until 1968.

The wooden wings of Ansons flying in Australia were found to fail at a high rate. The phenolic glue bonds would part, and it was speculated that the problem was due to the high humidity. In 1962, the Commonwealth Government decided to ground the majority of wooden-winged aircraft then in operation; amongst those aircraft affected, the Anson and De Havilland Mosquito were included. Of the Ansons, no such aircraft were re-registered as the government had mandated a test that essentially destroyed the wings, thus requiring the fitting of new wings. Most owners decided to voluntarily scrap their aircraft well before this time.

By the 21st century, the vast majority of Ansons had been retired from flying. However, a single Anson Mk.I, which had been originally manufactured during 1943, had been restored to airworthiness, having been refitted with later metal wings. On 18 July 2012, this restored aircraft returned to the air in Nelson, New Zealand.

Accidents and incidents

 On 11 September 1937, Anson K8778 of No. 233 Squadron RAF crashed in poor visibility on the Gisborough Moor escarpment, above Guisborough in the North Riding of Yorkshire, while returning from an exercise with the Royal Navy; all four crew were killed.
 On 28 April 1939, Anson A4-32 of No. 6 Squadron RAAF crashed near Riverstone, New South Wales on the return leg of an air navigation course, killing all four crew members.
On 18 December 1939, Anson N4887 of 1 Flying Training School crashed on the Richmond Golf Course shortly after take-off from the Richmond RAAF Base, killing all five crew members.
 On 29 September 1940, Avro Ansons L9162 and N4876 of No. 2 Service Flying Training School RAAF collided in mid-air and became locked together in flight. A successful emergency landing was made at Brocklesby, New South Wales. L9162 became a ground instructional airframe, whilst N4876 was repaired and returned to service (see 1940 Brocklesby mid-air collision).
 On 8 November 1940 Avro Anson N9945 piloted by RAF Pilot Officer Frederick Phillip Fry struck a barrage balloon cable near Birmingham and crashed killing all 5 on board.
 On 28 January 1941 RAAF Avro Anson A4-5 left Parkes bound for Mascot on a medical evacuation flight. It approached Glenbrook and suffered a structural failure of the port wing crashing near the corner of Cliffton Ave and Lucasville Road killing all five on board.
At least 4 of the 6 aircrew survived the crash, but died of exposure in blizzard conditions. Their bodies are buried at the crash site.
 On 17 April 1942 Avro Anson W2630 of RAF Wigtown crashed into the east side of Galloway mountain Cairnsmore of Fleet near Creetown, southwest Scotland. The aircraft exploded on impact, killing the pilot and a civilian passenger. The wireless operator survived with severe burns. 
 On 2 July 1942 Avro Anson Mk.I N5297 of No.2 Observers Advanced Flying Unit (O)AFU crashed on Shalloch-on-Minnoch, South Ayrshire, during a navigation training flight out of Millom, Cumbria.  All five airmen, including three trainees, were killed.
 On 9 October 1942, four Royal Australian Air Force (RAAF) airmen were killed when their Avro Anson aircraft crashed near Clackline, Western Australia (see Avro Anson Memorial).
 On 30 October 1942 an Avro Anson took off from Sidney airport on Vancouver Island, British Columbia, Canada, with Royal Canadian Air Force Sgt. William Baird and British air force Pilot Officer Charles Fox, Pilot Officer Anthony Lawrence and Sgt. Robert Luckock aboard. The aircraft crashed, killing all aboard,  from takeoff, on a remote mountainside near Port Renfrew. The wreckage and remains of the crew were found by loggers in October 2013 and recovered in May 2014.
 On 7 December 1943 another piggy-back accident occurred when RCAF #18 SFTS Anson II JS193 came down on top of Anson II JS167 in the landing circuit at Gimli, Manitoba; the aircraft landed safely still entangled, and both were later repaired.
 On 19 January 1944 RCAF #2 Training Command, Anson II #7164 landed on top of Anson II #8561 and again both landed safely but entangled.  In this case #7164 was a write-off, but #8561 was repaired.
 On 13 February 1944 a USAAF 29(PR) Squadron AT-20 (Anson II) 43-8197 crashed on takeoff at Will Rogers Field, Oklahoma City, Oklahoma, 2Lt S.F. Jankowski killed, pilot V.N. Luber injured.  The pilots had forgotten to remove the gust locks from the controls. This was the only fatal accident involving a USAAF AT-20.
 On 19 December 1945, a Companhia Meridional de Transportes Avro Anson Mk. II registration PP-MTA crashed in the neighbourhood of Itaipu, Niterói, Brazil killing all passengers and crew, including the pilot and owner of the airline, Álvaro Araújo.
 On 14 December 1947 a Mark 1 AX505, ex VH-BBY, recently purchased by the Indonesian government and numbered RI-003, was being used to transport war equipment and medicine. It crashed in the sea between Malaya and Sumatra. The two crew were killed and were later appointed Indonesian National Heroes. There is a memorial to them with a sculpture of the aircraft.
 On 11 June 1948, Avro XIX G-AGNI of Lancashire Aircraft Corporation ditched off Bradda Head, Isle of Man due to fuel exhaustion. The aircraft was operating a scheduled passenger flight from Squires Gate Airport, Blackpool to Ronaldsway Airport, Isle of Man via RAF Walney Island, Lancashire.

Variants
The main Anson variant was the Mk I, of which 6,704 were built in Britain. The other variants were mainly distinguished by their powerplant with Canadian-built Ansons using local engines. To overcome steel shortages, the 1,051 Canadian-built Mk V Ansons featured a plywood fuselage.

Mk I 6,688 Mk Is were built. Powered by two  Armstrong Siddeley Cheetah IX or  XIX engines.
Mk II 1,401 Mk IIs were built in Canada; powered by two  Jacobs L-6MB R-915 engines and fitted with hydraulic landing gear retraction rather than the manual system used on the Anson I.
Mk III 432 Mk I aircraft converted in Canada to two  Jacobs L-6MB R-915 engines.
Mk IV One aircraft converted from a Mk I in Canada to two Wright R-975 Whirlwind engines.
Mk V 1,069 Mk Vs were built in Canada for navigator training powered by two  Pratt & Whitney R-985 Wasp Junior engines and given a new wood monocoque fuselage. 77 early Mk.V aircraft built using Mk.II components were designated Mk.VA. 
Mk VI One aircraft was built in Canada for bombing and gunnery training; it was powered by two  R-985 Wasp Junior engines.
Mk X 104 Anson Mk Is were converted into Mk Xs with a reinforced floor, for use as a transport.
Mk XI 90 Anson Mk Is were converted into Mk XIs.
Mk XII 20 Anson Mk Is were converted into Mk XIIs, plus 221 new Mk XII aircraft built.
Mk XIII Gunnery trainer powered by two Cheetah XI or XIX engines; never built.
Mk XIV Gunnery trainer powered by two Cheetah XV engines; never built.
Mk XVI Navigation trainer; never built.
Mk XV Bombing trainer; never built.
C 19 264 were built for the RAF; used as communications and transport aircraft.
T 20 Navigation trainer for the RAF, a variant of the Mk XIX to meet Air Ministry Specification T.24/46 for an overseas navigation trainer, one pilot two wireless operators (one trainee and one instructor) and five navigator positions (three trainees and two instructors). Used for bombing and navigation training in Southern Rhodesia, 60 built.
T 21 Navigation trainers for the RAF, a variant of the Mk XIX to meet Air Ministry Specification T.25/46 for a home navigation trainer, one pilot two wireless operators (one trainee and one instructor) and five navigator positions (three trainees and two instructors). A prototype was flown in May 1948, 252 were built.
C.21 Modification of T.21s for communications and transport duties.
T 22 Radio trainers for the RAF, a variant of the Mk XIX to meet Air Ministry Specification T.26/46, one pilot and four wireless operator stations (three for trainees and one for an instructor), a prototype was flown in June 1948, 54 built.
Anson 18 Developed from the Avro Nineteen; 12 aircraft were sold to the Royal Afghan Air Force for use as communications, police patrol and aerial survey aircraft.
Anson 18C 13 aircraft were built for the Indian government; used for training civil aircrews.
Avro Nineteen (Also known as the Anson XIX): Civil transport version; 56 aircraft were built in two series.
AT-20United States military designation for Canadian-built Anson IIs used by the United States Army Air Forces, 50 built.

Operators

 Royal Afghan Air Force – 13 Anson 18 aircraft were delivered to the Royal Afghan Air Force from 1948 and retired by 1972
 At least one, LV-FBR, in use in 1960
 Royal Australian Air Force –  1,028 Ansons were operated by the Royal Australian Air Force, retired in 1955
 Woods Airways, WA (two surplus aircraft, 1948 to 1961)
 Brain & Brown Airfreighters (one Anson until at least 1977)
 East-West Airlines, one preserved (non-flying), at Tamworth Airport

Gulf Aviation

Belgian Air Force (15 x Anson I, 2 x Anson 12s operated from 1946 to 1954)
 Companhia Meridional de Transportes (three Avro Anson Mk. IIs operated between 1945 and 1946)
 Royal Canadian Air Force and Royal Canadian Navy Ansons were retired in 1952
 three Canadian-built Ansons were transported to Cuba, operated by ANSA-Aerolíneas del Norte S.A., a regional airline from 1947 until the mid-1950s
 Czechoslovakian Air Force three aircraft, in service from 1945 to 1948
 Egyptian Air Force
 Estonian Air Force
 Ethiopian Air Force
 Finnish Air Force three Avro Anson Mk. Is purchased 1936 and used as training and liaison aircraft. One lost and another written-off in accidents, last flight in 1947.
 French Air Force and Aeronavale
 Hellenic Royal Air Force: twelve Mk I Ansons were ordered in 1938 for the maritime patrol role. Five of these escaped to Egypt after the Battle of Greece and operated under British command until replaced by Blenheims in 1942. 
 Royal Indian Air Force
Directorate of Civil Aviation  Indian Air Force
 Government of Indonesia chartered 2 Ansons during Indonesian National Revolution
 Imperial Iranian Air Force
 Royal Iraqi Air Force
 Irish Air Corps 9 Anson Mk1 delivered between 1937–39 and used for training/maritime patrol/transport. 3 Anson 19s delivered in 1946 for training/transport. Mk1s retired by 1947, 19s by 1962.
 Israeli Air Force
 Royal Netherlands Air Force and Dutch Naval Aviation Service
 Royal New Zealand Air Force
 Royal Norwegian Air Force
 Paraguayan Air Arm one Mk.V bought in Argentina in 1947.
 Portuguese Air Force
 Transportes Aéreos de Timor operated two Anson Is.
 Royal Rhodesian Air Force
 Royal Saudi Air Force
 South African Air Force
 Southern Rhodesian Air Force
 Syrian Air Force
 Turkish Air Force
 Royal Air Force
Fleet Air Arm
700 Naval Air Squadron
701 Naval Air Squadron
703 Naval Air Squadron
707 Naval Air Squadron
710 Naval Air Squadron
711 Naval Air Squadron
719 Naval Air Squadron
720 Naval Air Squadron
724 Naval Air Squadron
725 Naval Air Squadron
728 Naval Air Squadron
732 Naval Air Squadron
735 Naval Air Squadron
737 Naval Air Squadron
739 Naval Air Squadron
740 Naval Air Squadron
742 Naval Air Squadron
743 Naval Air Squadron
744 Naval Air Squadron
745 Naval Air Squadron
747 Naval Air Squadron
749 Naval Air Squadron
750 Naval Air Squadron
751 Naval Air Squadron
758 Naval Air Squadron
762 Naval Air Squadron
763 Naval Air Squadron
766 Naval Air Squadron
771 Naval Air Squadron
772 Naval Air Squadron
773 Naval Air Squadron
778 Naval Air Squadron
781 Naval Air Squadron
782 Naval Air Squadron
783 Naval Air Squadron
784 Naval Air Squadron
785 Naval Air Squadron
786 Naval Air Squadron
787 Naval Air Squadron
789 Naval Air Squadron
790 Naval Air Squadron
792 Naval Air Squadron
798 Naval Air Squadron
799 Naval Air Squadron
809 Naval Air Squadron
1830 Naval Air Squadron
1832 Naval Air Squadron
1833 Naval Air Squadron
1840 Naval Air Squadron
1841 Naval Air Squadron
 Blue Line Airways
 British European Airways
 Finglands Airways
 Ministry of Civil Aviation
 Railway Air Services
 Sivewright Airways
 Starways
 Transair
 50 Canadian built Ansons were delivered to the USAAF as the AT-20.
 SFR Yugoslav Air Force

Surviving aircraft

Australia
On display
 R9883 – Anson I on static display at the Camden Museum of Aviation in Camden, New South Wales.
 W2068 -Anson 1  VH-ASM. On public display in glass walled building at Tamworth Airport Tamworth NSW Australia. Operated post WW2 by East West Airlines (their first aircraft) then Marshall Airways. 
 W2121 – Anson I on static display at the Aviation Heritage Museum at Bull Creek, Western Australia.
 W2364 – Anson I displayed at the Nhill Aviation Heritage Centre in Nhill, Victoria.
 AX350 – Anson I on static display at the Lincoln Nitschke Aviation Collection at Greenock, South Australia.
Stored or under restoration
 W2472 – Anson I under restoration at the RAAF Amberley Aviation Heritage Centre in Amberley, Queensland.
 EF954 – Anson I under restoration at the South Australian Aviation Museum in Port Adelaide, South Australia. The restoration uses parts from AW965.
 LV284 – Anson I under restoration at the Avro Anson Museum in Ballarat, Victoria.
 MG222 – Anson I under restoration at the Queensland Air Museum in Caloundra, Queensland.
 MG422 – Anson I under restoration at the Evans Head Memorial Aerodrome in Evans Head, New South Wales.

Canada

On display
 886 – Anson II on static display at the Alberta Aviation Museum in Edmonton, Alberta.
 7135 – Anson II on static display at the Greenwood Military Aviation Museum in Greenwood, Nova Scotia.
 7481 – Anson II on static display at the Bomber Command Museum of Canada in Nanton, Alberta.
 12125 – Anson V on static display at the Commonwealth Air Training Plan Museum in Brandon, Manitoba.
 12518 – Anson V on static display at the Canada Aviation and Space Museum in Ottawa, Ontario.
 Composite – Anson II at The Hangar Flight Museum in Calgary, Alberta. It painted as RCAF 7401.
 Composite – Anson II on static display at the British Columbia Aviation Museum in Sidney, British Columbia. This airframe is K8786, restored using parts of FP846, as which it is painted.
 Unknown – Anson I on static display at the Saskatchewan Western Development Museum in Moose Jaw, Saskatchewan.
Unknown –  Anson II on static display at the National Air Force Museum of Canada in Trenton, Ontario

Stored or under restoration
 6081 - Anson Mk.I under restoration to static display at Saskatchewan aviation museum in Saskatoon, Saskatchewan.

 12417 – Anson V under restoration to airworthy condition at the Canadian Warplane Heritage Museum in Hamilton, Ontario.
 12477 – Anson V stored at the Reynolds-Alberta Museum in Wetaskiwin, Alberta.

Ireland
On display
 141 – Avro C.19 on static display at the Irish Air Corps Museum in Baldonnel, Dublin.

Netherlands
On display
 VM352 – Anson 19 on static display at the Canadian Allied Forces Museum Foundation in Groningen.

New Zealand

Airworthy
 MH120 – Anson I airworthy with R&R Aviation Limited in Wakefield, Tasman.
On display
 Composite – Anson I on static display at the Air Force Museum of New Zealand in Wigram, Canterbury. This airframe is a composite of several aircraft including the fuselage of NZ415, centre section, mainplane, and tailplane of VL352, and various other parts from NZ410 and NZ422.

United Arab Emirates
On display
 TX183 – Anson 19 on display at Al Mahata Museum in Sharjah.

United Kingdom
Airworthy
 G-AHKX – Avro XIX Anson airworthy with the Shuttleworth Collection at Old Warden Aerodrome, Bedfordshire. Formerly operated by the collection on behalf of the BAe Systems Heritage Flight, the aircraft was donated to the collection in 2022.
 WD413 – Anson C.21, now privately owned and registered as G-VROE. It was previously operated by Classic Air Force at Coventry Airport.

On display
 N4877 – Anson I on static display at the Imperial War Museum Duxford in Duxford, Cambridgeshire.
 LT773  VH-AZU – Anson I fuselage on static display at the Royal Air Force Museum London in London.
 TX213 – Anson C.19 on static display at the North East Land, Sea and Air Museums in Sunderland, Tyne and Wear.
 TX214 – Anson C.19 on static display at the Royal Air Force Museum Cosford in Cosford, Shropshire.
 TX266 – Anson C.19 on static display whilst under restoration at Montrose Air Station Heritage Centre.
 VL348 – Anson C.19 on static display at the Newark Air Museum in Newark, Nottinghamshire.
 VL349 – Anson C.19 on static display at the Norfolk and Suffolk Aviation Museum in Flixton, Suffolk.
 VM360 – Anson C.19 on static display at the National Museum of Flight in East Fortune, East Lothian.

Stored or under restoration
 AX246 – Anson I under restoration with Jet Art Aviation near Leeds, Yorkshire.
 TX235 – Anson C.19 under restoration with the Classic Air Force near Coventry, West Midlands.
 VM325 – Anson C.19 under restoration with the Carew Control Tower Group in Carew, Pembrokeshire.
 VV901 – Anson T.21 under restoration to static display at the Yorkshire Air Museum in Elvington, West Yorkshire.

Specifications (GR Mk I)

Notable planes
 Avro Anson RI-003

See also

References

Notes

Bibliography

 Cheesman, E. C. Brief Glory: the story of the ATA. Harborough Publishing, 1946.
 
 Donald, David and Jon Lake, eds. Encyclopedia of World Military Aircraft. London: AIRtime Publishing, 1996. .
 Ellis, Ken. Wrecks & Relics – 25th Edition. Manchester, England: Crecy Publishing, 2016. 
 Franks, Norman. The Air Battle of Dunkirk. London: William Kimber, 1983. .
 Gerdessen, Frederik. "Estonian Air Power 1918 – 1945". Air Enthusiast, No. 18, April – July 1982. pp. 61–76. .
 Gunston, Bill. Classic World War II Aircraft Cutaways. London: Osprey, 1995. .
 
 Jackson, A.J. Avro Aircraft since 1908, 2nd edition. London: Putnam Aeronautical Books, 1990. .
 Hall, Alan W. Avro Anson Mks. 1–22 (Warpaint Series No. 53). Bletchley, Buckinghamshire, UK: Warpaint Books Ltd., 2006.
 Hall, Alan W. and Eric Taylor. Avro Anson Marks I, III, IV & X. London: Almark Publishing Co. Ltd., 1972. .
 Holmes, Harry. Avro Anson (Images of Aviation). London: Tempus Publishing Ltd., 2000. .

 March, Peter R. "Anson's 50th Birthday". Air Pictorial, Vol. 47, No. 7, July 1985. pp. 260–264.
 "Modernity for the R.A.F.: A Low-wing Cantilever Monoplane Goes Into Service — The Avro Anson, Equipped for Long-Range Over-water Reconnaissance: High Performance and a Comfortable Cabin". Flight, 30 January 1936, Vol. XXIX, No. 1414, pp. c–d, 117–119. 
 Middleton, Don. "RAF Piston Trainers No. 8: Avro Anson". Aeroplane Monthly, April 1980, Vol. 8, No. 4. pp. 186–193. .
 Mondey, David. The Hamlyn Concise Guide to British Aircraft of World War II. London: Chancellor Press. 1994. .

 Sturtivant, Ray C. The Anson File. Tonbridge, Kent, UK: Air-Britain (Historians) Ltd., 1988. .
 Sturtivant, Ray. "Avro Anson: The chronicles of 'Faithful Annie'". Air Enthusiast, Forty-two, 1991. pp. 37–51. .

External links

RNZAF Museum Anson page
Anson from the IBCC Digital Archive at the University of Lincoln.

Anson
1930s British military reconnaissance aircraft
1930s British military trainer aircraft
Low-wing aircraft
Aircraft first flown in 1935
Twin piston-engined tractor aircraft
World War II aircraft of Finland